
Gmina Wierzbica is a rural gmina (administrative district) in Radom County, Masovian Voivodeship, in east-central Poland.

Villages
Gmina Wierzbica contains the villages and settlements of Błędów, Dąbrówka Warszawska, Łączany, Podgórki, Polany, Polany-Kolonia, Pomorzany, Pomorzany-Kolonia, Ruda Wielka, Rzeczków, Rzeczków-Kolonia, Stanisławów, Suliszka, Wierzbica, Wierzbica-Kolonia, Zalesice and Zalesice-Kolonia.

Neighbouring gminas
Gmina Wierzbica is bordered by the gminas of Iłża, Jastrząb, Kowala, Mirów, Mirzec, Orońsko and Skaryszew.

References
Polish official population figures 2006

Wierzbica
Gmina Wierzbica